Rachid Chouhal (born 14 February 1975 in Meknès, Morocco) is a Moroccan-born athlete representing Malta internationally who competes in the long jump and sprinting events. He came 4th in Heat 4 of the 100 metres Preliminaries at the 2012 Summer Olympics. He has won multiple medals for Malta at the Games of the Small States of Europe.

Competition record

References

External links
 

1975 births
Living people
People with acquired Maltese citizenship
Maltese male sprinters
Maltese long jumpers
Male long jumpers
Athletes (track and field) at the 2002 Commonwealth Games
Athletes (track and field) at the 2012 Summer Olympics
Commonwealth Games competitors for Malta
Olympic athletes of Malta
People from Meknes
Maltese people of Moroccan descent
European Games competitors for Malta
Athletes (track and field) at the 2015 European Games
Athletes (track and field) at the 2001 Mediterranean Games
Athletes (track and field) at the 2005 Mediterranean Games
Mediterranean Games competitors for Malta